Nordenskiöld or Nordenskjöld or Nordenskjold or Nordenskiold may refer to:

 Nordenskiöld (surname), people with the surname Nordenskiöld

Places
Antarctica
 Nordenskjold Coast, a section of the coast of the east side of the Antarctic Peninsula
 Nordenskjold Basin, an undersea basin in the Antarctic
 Nordenskjold Ice Tongue in the Antarctic
 Nordenskjold Glacier in the Antarctic
 Nordenskjold Outcrops in the Antarctic
 Nordenskjold Peak, a mountain in the Antarctic
 Nordenskiöld Base
Greenland
 Nordenskiold Fjord in Greenland
 Nordenskiold Glacier, East Greenland
 Nordenskiold Glacier, Northwest Greenland
 Nordenskiold Glacier, West Greenland 
Russia
 Nordenskjold Archipelago, an island group in the Kara Sea.
 Nordenskiöld Bay, Novaya Zemlya
 Nordenskiöld Glacier (Novaya Zemlya)
Elsewhere
 Nordenskiöld Lake, an alpine lake in Chile's Torres del Paine national park
 Nordenskiold Bay in Svalbard
 Nordenskiöld Land, in Svalbard

See also
 List of craters on Mars: H–N
 Laptev Sea